
Year 244 (CCXLIV) was a leap year starting on Monday (link will display the full calendar) of the Julian calendar. At the time, it was known as the Year of the Consulship of Armenius and Aemilianus (or, less frequently, year 997 Ab urbe condita). The denomination 244 for this year has been used since the early medieval period, when the Anno Domini calendar era became the prevalent method in Europe for naming years.

Events 
 By place 
 Roman Empire 
 January 13 - March 14 – Battle of Misiche: King Shapur I of the Sasanian Empire delivers a counter-attack near Fallujah (Iraq), and defeats the Roman army upstream of the Euphrates.    
 February 11 – Emperor Gordian III is murdered by mutinous soldiers in Zaitha (Mesopotamia). A mound is raised at Carchemish in his memory.  
 Philip the Arab (Marcus Julius Philippus) declares himself co-emperor, and makes a controversial peace with the Sassanian Empire, withdrawing from their territory and giving Shapur 500,000 gold pieces. The Sassanians occupy Armenia.
 Philip the Arab is recognized by the Roman Senate as the new Roman Emperor with the honorific Augustus. He nominates his son Philippus, age 6, with the title of Caesar and makes him heir to the throne; gives his brother Priscus supreme power (rector Orientis) in the Eastern provinces; and begins construction of the city of Shahba (Syria) in the province of his birth. 
  The vassal Upper Mesopotamian kingdom of Osroene is absorbed into the Roman Empire, its last ruler being Abgar (XI) Farhat Bar Ma’nu.

 Asia 
 Battle of Xingshi:  Shu Han defeats the Chinese state of Cao Wei. 

 Korea 
 The Goguryeo–Wei War is fought between the Korean kingdom Goguryeo and the Chinese state Cao Wei.

 By topic 
 Art and Science 
 Plotinus, Greek philosopher, escapes the bloodshed that accompanies the murder of Gordianus III and makes his way to Antioch. Back in Rome he founds his Neoplatonist school and attracts disciples like Porphyry, Castricius Firmus and Eustochius of Alexandria.
 244–249 – Bust of Philip the Arab (in Braccio Nuovo, Vatican Museums, Rome).

 Commerce 
 The silver content of the Roman denarius falls to 0.5 percent under emperor Philippus I, down from 28 percent under Gordian III.

 Religion 
 244–245 – Last phase of construction of the house-style Dura-Europos synagogue in Syria, one of the oldest to survive (wall-paintings in the National Museum of Damascus, Syria).

Births 
 December 22 – Diocletian, Roman emperor (d. 311)
 Alexander of Constantinople, bishop of Byzantium (approximate date)

Deaths 
 February 11 – Gordian III, Roman emperor (b. 225)
 Cao Xun, Chinese prince of the Cao Wei state (b. 231)
 Ge Xuan (or Xiaoxian), Chinese Taoist (b. 164)
 Zhang Cheng (or Zhongsi), Chinese general (b. 178)

References